Lactarius cyanescens is a member of the large milk-cap genus Lactarius in the order Russulales. It was first described as new to science in 2007.

See also

List of Lactarius species

References

External links

cyanescens
Fungi described in 2007
Fungi of Asia